Henri Ulysse Walter (14 February 1910 – 9 January 1945) was a French boxer. He competed in the men's featherweight event at the 1932 Summer Olympics. He was killed during the Second World War.

Walter also served in the 78th Infantry Regiment of the French Army during the Second World War and was taken prisoner by German forces. He was killed during an escape attempt on 9 January 1945.

References

1910 births
1945 deaths
French male boxers
Olympic boxers of France
Boxers at the 1932 Summer Olympics
Sportspeople from Doubs
Featherweight boxers
French Army personnel of World War II
French military personnel killed in World War II
French prisoners of war in World War II
World War II prisoners of war held by Germany